Aşağı Daşkəsən is a village in the municipality of Daşkəsən in the Dashkasan District of Azerbaijan. The village had an Armenian population before the exodus of Armenians from Azerbaijan after the outbreak of the Nagorno-Karabakh conflict.

References

Populated places in Dashkasan District